Veľké Teriakovce is a village and municipality in the Rimavská Sobota District of the Banská Bystrica Region of southern Slovakia. The village consists of four part, Malé Teriakovce, Vrbovce nad Rimavou, Veľké Teriakovce and Krásna. Veľké Teriakovce is known for the fruit breeding. Village sightseeings are evangelical church from 1790 and a historical mill.

References

External links
 
 
Article about historical mill
http://www.e-obce.sk/obec/velketeriakovce/velke-teriakovce.html

Villages and municipalities in Rimavská Sobota District